William Earl Britt (born December 7, 1932) is a senior United States district judge of the United States District Court for the Eastern District of North Carolina.

Education and career

Britt was born in McDonald, North Carolina. He is the younger brother of David M. Britt. He received a Bachelor of Science degree from Wake Forest University in 1956 and a Bachelor of Laws from Wake Forest University School of Law in 1958. He was in the United States Army (SP-4) from 1953 to 1955. He was a law clerk for Justice Emery B. Denny of the North Carolina Supreme Court from 1958 to 1959. He was in private practice of law in Fairmont and Lumberton, North Carolina from 1959 to 1980.

Federal judicial service
Britt was nominated by President Jimmy Carter on April 14, 1980, to a seat on the United States District Court for the Eastern District of North Carolina vacated by Judge John Davis Larkins Jr. He was confirmed by the United States Senate on May 21, 1980, and received his commission on May 23, 1980. He served as Chief Judge from 1983 to 1990. Britt assumed senior status on December 7, 1997. As of 2020, Britt is the last judge for the Eastern District of North Carolina to be appointed by a Democratic president.

References

External links
 

1932 births
Living people
Judges of the United States District Court for the Eastern District of North Carolina
People from Robeson County, North Carolina
United States district court judges appointed by Jimmy Carter
20th-century American judges
Wake Forest University alumni
Wake Forest University School of Law alumni
United States Army soldiers
North Carolina lawyers
People from Fairmont, North Carolina
People from Lumberton, North Carolina
Military personnel from North Carolina
21st-century American judges